Paul Augustus Maloy (June 4, 1892 – March 18, 1976) was a relief pitcher in Major League Baseball who played briefly for the Boston Red Sox during the  season. He was born in Bascom, Ohio. 

In a two-game career, Maloy, who was nicknamed "Biff", posted a 9.00 ERA with one walk and two hits allowed in 2.0 innings of work. He did not have a decision.

Maloy died in Sandusky, Ohio at age 83.

External links

Retrosheet

Major League Baseball pitchers
Boston Red Sox players
Baseball players from Ohio
People from Seneca County, Ohio
1892 births
1976 deaths
Battle Creek Crickets players